Bungkaih Station (BKH) is a class III railway station located in Keude Bungkaih, Muara Batu, North Aceh Regency, bordering with Ulee Madon. The station, which is located at an altitude of +7 meters, is included in the Regional Division I North Sumatra and Aceh.

The station was inaugurated on 1 December 2013 as part of a railway reconstruction project in Aceh that was decommissioned in the 1970s. For the initial phase, a railway line was built that connecting Krueng Geukueh with Krueng Mane along 11 km.

Services 

References

External links

north Aceh Regency
railway stations in Aceh
railway stations opened in 1904
1900s establishments in the Dutch East Indies